Ushant Airport , is an airport serving the French island of Ushant. It is located in the commune of Lampaul within the département of Finistère.

Airlines and destinations 
The following airlines operate regular scheduled and charter flights at Ushant Airport:

Statistics

References

External links 

Airports in Brittany
Ushant